The former First Church of Christ, Scientist, built in 1940, is an historic Christian Science church building located at 391 Walnut Street on the corner of Otis Street in the village of Newtonville, in Newton, Massachusetts. It was designed in the redbrick Colonial Revival style by Densmore, LeClear and Robbins, architects. Due to cost constraints, its steeple was added later. In September, 2004, the church sold its building for $1,050,000 to be converted into apartments. The church in 2007 held services in rented rooms at 300 Walnut Street in the Masonic Building., but is now meeting at 1141 Walnut Street, in Newton Highlands. The building has since been divided into 11 condominium units. It is now called the Oxford House, and was the city's first inclusionary zoning project.

The building is a contributing property in the Newtonville Historic District, which was added to the National Register of Historic Places on September 4, 1986.

See also
National Register of Historic Places listings in Newton, Massachusetts
List of former Christian Science churches, societies and buildings
 First Church of Christ, Scientist (disambiguation)

References

External links
 City of Newton real property database
 City of Newton's Inclusionary Zoning Ordinance

Churches completed in 1940
20th-century Christian Science church buildings
Historic district contributing properties in Newton, Massachusetts
Christian Science churches in Massachusetts
Former Christian Science churches, societies and buildings in the United States
Churches in Newton, Massachusetts
Former churches in Massachusetts
Historic district contributing properties in Massachusetts
National Register of Historic Places in Newton, Massachusetts